The 2009 season was the fifth for the DSB Bank–LTO cycling team, which started as DSB Bank in 2005.

Roster
  Liesbeth Bakker
  Janneke Busser
  Liesbet De Vocht
  Agnieta Francke
  Elke Gebhardt
  Josephine Groeneveld
  Angela Hennig
  Yvonne Hijgenaar
  Tina Liebig
  Bertine Spijkerman
  Noortje Tabak
  Marieke van Wanroij
  Annemiek van Vleuten
  Daisy van der Aa
  Adrie Visser
  Marianne Vos
Source

Season victories

Results in major races

Women's World Cup 2009

Marianne Vos finished 1st in the individual and the team finished 2nd in the teams overall standing.

UCI World Ranking

The team finished 3rd in the UCI ranking for teams.

References

2009 UCI Women's Teams seasons
2009 in Dutch sport
Rabo-Liv Women Cycling Team